CAHOOTS (Crisis Assistance Helping Out On The Streets) is a mental-health-crisis intervention program in Eugene, Oregon, which has handled some lower-risk emergency calls involving mental illness since 1989. In most American cities, police respond to such calls, and at least 25% of people killed in police encounters had been suffering from serious mental illness.

Other cities in the US and other countries have investigated or implemented the concept. In 2015 Stockholm a similar concept was implemented and considered a success. After the George Floyd protests in 2020, several hundred cities in the US interested in implementing similar programs requested information from CAHOOTS.

Program 
Calls to 911 that are related to addiction, disorientation, mental health crises, and homelessness but which don't pose a danger to others are routed to CAHOOTS. Staff members respond in pairs; usually one has training as a medic and the other has experience in street outreach or mental health support. Responders attend to immediate health issues, de-escalate, and help formulate a plan, which may include finding a bed in a homeless shelter or transportation to a healthcare facility.  CAHOOTS is dependent upon the availability of other services:  a team may be able to talk a person in crisis into going to a hospital or a homeless shelter, but there must be a hospital or homeless shelter available to accept the person. In 2020, the service began operating 24 hours a day.

CAHOOTS does not handle requests that involve violence, weapons, crimes, medical emergencies, or similarly dangerous situations. Some calls require both CAHOOTS and law enforcement to be called out initially, and sometimes CAHOOTS calls in law enforcement or law enforcement calls in CAHOOTS, for instance in the case of a homeless person who is in danger of being ticketed. About 60%, of all calls to CAHOOTS are for homeless people.

In 2019, CAHOOTS responded to 13% of all emergency calls for service made to the Eugene Police Department. But the public is aware of the program, and many of the calls made are requests for CAHOOTS service and not ones to which police would normally respond. In 2019, 83% of the calls to which CAHOOTS responded were for either "Welfare Check", "Transportation", or general public assistance, none of which are traditionally handled by EPD. Thus the "true divert rate"—meaning the proportion of calls to which police would have responded were it not for CAHOOTS—was estimated to be between 5-8%.

Calls handled by CAHOOTS alone require police backup only about 2% of the time, but that rate is much higher when responding to calls that police would normally handle. For example, in 2019 when CAHOOTS responded to calls for "Criminal Trespass" and located the subject, they needed police backup 33% of the time.

The internal organization operates by in a non-hierarchical, consensus-oriented model. As of 2020, most staff were paid US $18 per hour. In 2018, the program cost $800,000, as compared to $58 million for the police.

Replicating the model 
Many places struggle to implement this model because it is dependent upon the existence of appropriate social services in the area.  One director at CAHOOTS asks, "Where are you going to bring someone if not to the hospital or the jail?" Nonetheless, in 2020 Denver started a similar program, and Taleed El-Sabawi and Jennifer J. Carroll wrote a paper detailing considerations for local governments to keep in mind, as well as model legislation.

History 
CAHOOTS was founded in 1989 by the Eugene Police Department and White Bird Clinic, a nonprofit mental health crisis intervention initiative that had been in existence since 1969 as an "alternative for those who didn't trust the cops." From its founding, White Bird Clinic had an informal working relationship with local law enforcement. CAHOOTS formalized the relationship. The name, an acronym for Crisis Assistance Helping Out On The Streets, was chosen because the White Bird Clinic "was now 'in cahoots' with the police."

References 

Eugene, Oregon
Mental health organizations in the United States
Law enforcement non-governmental organizations in the United States
Organizations established in 1989
Non-profit organizations based in the United States
Criminal justice reform in the United States